In mathematics, algebraic cobordism is an analogue of complex cobordism for smooth quasi-projective schemes over a field.

An oriented cohomology theory on the category of smooth quasi-projective schemes Sm over a field k consists of a contravariant functor A* from Sm to commutative graded rings, together with push-forward maps f* whenever f:Y→X has relative dimension d for some d. These maps have to satisfy various conditions similar to those satisfied by complex cobordism. In particular they  are "oriented", which means roughly that they behave well on vector bundles; this is closely related to the condition that a generalized cohomology theory has a complex orientation.

Over a field of characteristic 0, algebraic cobordism is the universal oriented cohomology theory  for smooth varieties. In other words there is a unique morphism of oriented cohomology theories from algebraic cobordism to any other oriented cohomology theory.

 and  give surveys of algebraic cobordism.

References

 

Algebraic geometry
Algebraic topology